Chenopodium pallidicaule, known as cañihua, canihua or cañahua (from Quechua qañiwa, qañawa or qañawi) and also kaniwa, is a species of goosefoot, similar in character and uses to the closely related quinoa (Chenopodium quinoa).

Cañihua is native to the Andean region, with more than 200 varieties, and it has been farmed in the Altiplano for millennia. As a crop, cañihua has distinct characteristics, including tolerance of high mountain conditions, high content of protein and dietary fiber, and rich phenolic content.

Botanical description
Cañihua is a herbaceous and annual plant. This species is diploid with a chromosome number of 2n = 18. There are two types of this species, which differ in their branching. The lasta type shows high branching, whereas the saguia type is characterized by few branching and its more erected growth. The plant grows to 20–60 cm high and is therefore shorter than its close relative quinoa.

Cañihua also vary from quinoa in its inflorescence and its flower traits. The inflorescences are situated on
the terminal and axillar cimas. The flowers are small and without petals. There are
three different types of flower. Hermaphrodite consists of both the stamen and the pistils. Another flower type are the pistillate flowers, which have pistils, but no stamens. The third type of flower are male sterile flowers.

The fruits are small and dark, which contain brown or black seed with a diameter of 0.5 to 1.5 mm. The fruits are deciduous, which means that the seeds are lost spontaneously and are then dispersed. Once maturation is reached, the plant stem and leaves change in colour to yellow, red, green or purple.

Uses
Cañihua can easily be milled to flour and can be prepared further as a toasted cañihua flour called cañihuaco. Cañihuaco has a nutty taste and can be mixed with water and milk for a breakfast meal. Since it is rich in calories and proteins, local people take it on long travels. Additionally, cañihua flour can be used for a lot of other purposes such as bread-making, pastry-making and noodle-making. Some varieties of cañihua can even be included in sweets, snacks and weaning food mixtures.

The cooking and extrusion technology tests have already shown successful results in several countries.  This technology present numerous advantages such as low cost, simple operation, moderate production volume, minimum auxiliary equipment, versatility, good sanitary conditions and easy management. Results from a study demonstrated that the initial moisture content of 12% was optimal to obtain an extrudate with good physicochemical characteristics (e.g. degree of gelatinization, sectional expansion index, water absorption index, water solubility index and density). Additionally, roasting does not significantly affect the dialyzability of nutritionally valuable minerals in qañiwa. Boiling, however, was found to increase zinc, iron and calcium dialyzability.

Importance for food security
Cañihua is an important crop for food security in the Andean region where there are nutritional problems. The most affected group are rural families having limited access to commodities due to poverty and droughts. Cañihua is both easily accessible and drought-resistant, offering potential food and income for highland farmers.

In order to alleviate problems of food security, new food-processing technologies and products are being developed to encourage companies to process native Andean crops and to increase their consumption as well as open market opportunities using cañihua.

Nutritional value
The indigenous Andean food crops, quinoa (Chenopodium quinoa), kiwicha (Amaranthus caudatus) and cañihua have high nutritional value based mainly on their considerable protein content and dietary fiber value.  Their protein, calcium, zinc and iron content is higher than that of more widely commercialized cereals.

The protein content (15.3%) of cañihua grain is higher than that of quinoa and kiwicha, and similar to wheat (12.6%) and oats (16.9%). The lipids consist mainly of unsaturated fatty acids. Unlike quinoa, cañihua contains a lower amount of the bitter tasting saponins which affect taste and texture.

Cultivation
Cañihua is a half-domesticated plant from the highlands of Bolivia and Peru, cultivated as a pseudocereal crop for its seeds.
Both seeds and leaves are edible.

The plant was often cultivated in South America in the past. More than 200 varieties are known in Bolivia, but only twenty are still in use, with a majority of farmers cultivating just one.

Environmental requirements
Cañihua is well-adapted to the Andean climate and therefore cold-resistant in all growth stages. Adult plants are also resistant to night frosts. In vegetative stage, the plant may survive until –10 °C, flowers until –3 °C  and is growing until temperatures up to 28 °C at sufficient humidity.

Cañihua can be grown from 1500 m up to 4400 m, but is rarely cultivated below 3800 m. The plant has resistance to strong winds, heavy rainfalls, most pests and diseases, and even prolonged drought periods. Rainfall from 500 to 800 mm during the growing season makes irrigation unnecessary. The plant does not grow well in shade, maritime exposure or excess humidity. Cañihua can be grown on any kind of moderately fertile soil, including shallow, acid, alkaline or saline soils.

Plant development
As an annual crop, cañihua reaches maturity in 95 to 150 days, depending on variety. Germinating starts at soil temperatures of 5 °C. Flowering happens from July to October at temperatures around 10 °C and ripening from August to October at 15 °C.

Harvesting and post-harvesting
Cañihua has to be harvested at colour change, before full maturation, to prevent high yield losses due to seed scattering. The crop has to be cut, dried and threshed by hand or using a wheat thresher. Papery husks enclose the seeds and have to be washed and rubbed away. Average seed yield is 400 – 900 kg/ha in traditional cropping systems. In intensive systems, yields of 2–3 t can be obtained. 1000–kernel weight (weight in grams of 1,000 seeds) is only 480 mg, compared to 1900 mg - 4000 mg of quinoa.

Potential and risks
Cañihua is often considered as a forgotten crop once widely used in the Andes, but now replaced by other crops such as millet. Today, cañihua has significance only at higher altitudes, where neither quinoa nor millet can grow. In analogy to the success of quinoa and the increasing demand for it in western countries, cañihua has growing market potential. The crop was experimentally produced in Finland and showed good results. The risk of outcrossing is very small, as cañihua is self-pollinating. The risk of becoming invasive remains. The most important breeding aims are the reduction of seed scattering and increased seed size.

See also 
 Quinoa
 Kiwicha (Foxtrail amaranth)
 Chia

Reference list

External links 

 Andean Grains and Legumes
 Chenopodium pallidicaule on Plants for a Future database
 Canihua (Chenopodium pallidicaule) at Crops for the Future

pallidicaule
Flora of western South America
Flora of Peru
Crops originating from South America
Pseudocereals